Nunnington railway station was located about  west of Nunnington in North Yorkshire, England.

History
It opened on 9 October 1871 and the regular passenger service ceased in 1953 although goods traffic and special passenger trains ran until the line closed completely in August 1964.

The station building is now a private house and can still be seen from the Nunnington to Oswaldkirk back road, just before the cutting at Caulkeys Bank.

References

External links
 Nunnington station on navigable 1947 O. S. map

Disused railway stations in North Yorkshire
Railway stations in Great Britain opened in 1871
Railway stations in Great Britain closed in 1953
Former North Eastern Railway (UK) stations